The 2021 Little League Softball World Series was held in Greenville, North Carolina from August 11 to August 18, 2021. Ten teams from the United States competed for the Little League Softball World Series Championship.

Teams
Each team that competed in the tournament came out of one of the 10 regions.

Results

All times US EST.

Elimination round

References

Little League Softball World Series
2021 in softball
2021 in sports in North Carolina
Softball in North Carolina